Waterland is a 1983 novel by Graham Swift, set in the Fenland of eastern England. It won the Guardian Fiction Prize, and was shortlisted for the Booker Prize.

In 1992, it was adapted into a film, starring Jeremy Irons.

Themes
Waterland is concerned with the nature and importance of history as the primary source of meaning in a narrative. For this reason, it is associated with new historicism. Waterland can also be said to fall under the category of postmodern literature. It has characteristics associated with postmodern literature, such as a fragmented narrative style, where events are not told in chronological order. An unreliable narrator is also present. Major themes in the novel include storytelling and history, exploring how the past leads to future consequences.

The plot of the novel revolves around loosely interwoven themes and narrative, including the attraction of the narrator's brother to his girlfriend/wife, a resulting murder, a girl having an abortion that leaves her sterile, and her later struggle with depression. As an adult woman, she kidnaps a baby.

This personal narrative is set in the context of a wider history, of the narrator's family, the Fens in general, and the eel.

Plot summary
Tom Crick, fifty-two years old, has been history master for some thirty years in a secondary school in Greenwich. As the world sets its clocks according to Greenwich Mean Time, this is a place where time begins. Tom has been married to Mary for as long as he has been teaching, but the couple have no children. The students in Tom's school have grown increasingly scientifically oriented, and the headmaster, a physicist, has little sympathy for Tom's subject. One of Tom's students, Price, questions the relevance of learning about historical events. The youth's scepticism causes Tom to change his teaching approach to telling tales drawn from his own recollection. 

By doing so, he makes himself a part of the history he is teaching, relating his tales to local history and genealogy. The headmaster, Lewis, tries to entice Tom into taking an early retirement. Tom resists this because his leaving would mean that the History Department would cease to exist and would be combined with the broader area of General Studies. Tom's wife is arrested for snatching a baby. The publicity that attends her arrest reflects badly on the school, and Tom is told that he now must retire. In response, he uses his impending forced retirement as an excuse to recount a story to his students. The pivot of Waterland focuses on both the past in 1943, and the present time thirty years after – all related through the eyes of Tom as an adolescent.

The novel addresses some three hundred years of local history – including that of Tom's family – this relates to the broader historical currents of past centuries. It refers to smuggling and the isolation in the small towns of the Fens. 

Much of the contemporary plot centres on Tom's tumultuous relationship with Mary, both as teenagers and after their marriage. Tom's brother Dick is mentally handicapped; he grows increasingly jealous when they are teenagers because of his own attraction to Mary. She grew up on her father's farm, located near the house of Tom's family. Tom's father, a lock-keeper, has a home with his two sons in the lock-keeper's cottage, beside a tributary of the Great Ouse. Tom's mother dies when he is ten years old. Mary's mother had died during her birth, and she is confined by a rigid religious upbringing from her father in her childhood. 

As Mary matures, her interest in men grows, and she and Tom slip into an illicit relationship. Dick resents them. When she learns she is pregnant, Dick overhears and asks Mary if he is the father. He thinks if she is, she will have to devote something to him. Mary tells him another boy, Freddie Parr, is the father. Distraught at this information, Dick fights with a drunken Freddie, who is unable to swim, and pushes him into the river. Tom's father finds and pulls Freddie's body from the sluice, not realising that his drowning is not accidental. But that is the conclusion of the coroner's inquest. When Mary fails to provoke a miscarriage, she and Tom – who is the father of the child – go to an old crone for an abortion. Mary contracts septicaemia and later learns that she has been made sterile. 

Her father forces her into seclusion, and for three years she remains isolated. The two fathers finally agree to allow their children to come together again. Unknown to them, Tom, away fighting in World War II, has already written to Mary. When he comes home, the two marry. Tom begins his teaching career while Mary takes a job in an old people's home.

The novel returns to the present day, with Tom's growing horror over the child taken by Mary, who believes it is a gift from God. He must take action and return it to the real mother, despite his wife's pleas. Mary, obviously unstable and suffering from grief for years after her abortion, is arrested after the baby is returned. Tom is later told that she has been committed to a mental institute.

The plot closes on a final flashback, which shows Dick's breakdown following the revelation that he was born from the incestuous relationship his grandfather forced on his daughter, his and Tom's mother. His adoptive father has never really accepted him or valued him as he does Tom. Dick becomes drunk on liquor he found in an old chest from his real father – which also coincidentally held the letters revealing his true parentage – and rides away on his motorbike. Frantic, his family gain use of friends' boat, and find Dick several miles away, about to jump into the water. Despite their pleas and assurances he will be valued as equal to Tom, Dick throws himself in the water and drowns. His death haunts Tom for the rest of his life.

Film adaptation
In 1992, a film version of Waterland was released, directed by Stephen Gyllenhaal and starring Jeremy Irons. The adaptation retained some major plot points but moved the contemporary location to Pittsburgh, and eliminated many of the extensive historical asides.

Further reading
 Bentley, Nick. "Graham Swift, Waterland". In Contemporary British Fiction (Edinburgh: Edinburgh University Press, 2008), 131–40. .

External links
Waterland Study Guide by Graham Swift
Graham Swift's Waterland
 

1983 British novels
English philosophical novels
Novels by Graham Swift
British novels adapted into films
Novels set in Cambridgeshire
Fiction set in 1943
Family saga novels
Fens of England
Abortion in fiction